Hoya aldrichii , commonly known as the Christmas Island Waxvine is a species of flowering plant in the Apocynaceae or dogbane family. It is a vine that is endemic to Christmas Island, an Australian territory in the north-eastern Indian Ocean, where it is a common epiphyte in the shrublands of the island's coastal terraces.  The specific epithet honours Captain Aldrich, commander of the survey vessel HMS Egeria, which visited Christmas Island in 1887.

Description
Hoya aldrichii is a tall climber. Its stems are glabrous with pale bark.  The leaves are elliptical, rounded at the base, entire, acuminate or acute and glabrous; they are 75–150 mm long, 35–60 mm wide, with a  10–15 mm long petiole. The flowers occur in umbels of 15–30, are white through pink to deep purple-pink in colour, and are fragrant at night.  The seeds are oblong and about 5 mm long.

Taxonomy
The vine has at times been considered close to, or even synonymous with, H. cinnamomifolia Hook., H. pottsii Traill., and H. diversifolia Blume.

References

Notes

Sources
 
 

aldrichii
Gentianales of Australia
Endemic flora of Christmas Island
Vines
Plants described in 1890
Taxa named by William Hemsley (botanist)